Stuffed tomatoes are one of a number of dishes in which tomatoes are filled with ingredients, usually including rice.

Names
In various languages, the name of the dish literally means "stuffed tomatoes", including  and ).

Preparation and ingredients
In Turkey, the fruit are stuffed with meat (lamb) and rice; other ingredients are onion, parsley, olive oil, mint, black pepper, and salt. In the Roman dish, the filing is traditionally made with rice alone and it can additionally be flavored with cinnamon.

In Provence, France, it is common to prepare tomate farcies with minced meat, breadcrumbs and cheese. In Nice, the fruits are initially emptied and subsequently flavored with a filling of onion, garlic, aubergine, pepper, tomato paste and marjoram.

See also
 List of stuffed dishes

References

Balkan cuisine
Azerbaijani cuisine
Italian cuisine
Stuffed vegetable dishes
Turkish stews
Turkish cuisine dolmas and sarmas
Tomato dishes